Acetoacetyl-CoA synthase (NphT7) is an enzyme with systematic name acetyl-CoA:malonyl-CoA C-acetyltransferase (decarboxylating). This enzyme catalyses the following chemical reaction

 acetyl-CoA + malonyl-CoA  acetoacetyl-CoA + CoA + CO2

The enzyme from the soil bacterium Streptomyces sp. CL190 produces acetoacetyl-CoA.

References

External links 
 

EC 2.3.1